The Yupiit or Yupiat (sg. Yup'ik, dual Yupiik), also Central Alaskan Yup'ik,  are an Alaska Native people of western and southwestern Alaska, ranging from the Norton Sound down along the coast of the Bering Sea (including on Nelson Island and Nunivak Islands) to Bristol Bay as far south as the Alaska Peninsula at Naknek River and Egegik Bay. They are also known as Cup'ik by the Chevak Cup'ik-speaking people of Chevak and Cup'ig for the Nunivak Cup'ig-speaking people of Nunivak Island.

The Yupiit are the most numerous of the various Alaska Native groups and speak the Central Alaskan Yup'ik language, a member of the Eskimo–Aleut family of languages. As of the 2010 U.S. Census, the Yupiit population in the United States numbered over 34,000 people, of whom over 22,000 lived in Alaska. The vast majority of these live in the seventy or so communities in the traditional Yup'ik territory of western and southwestern Alaska. About 10,000 speak the language. The Yup'ik had the greatest number of people who identified with one tribal grouping and no other race (29,000). In that census, nearly half of American Indians and Alaska Natives identified as being of mixed race.

Yup'ik, Cup'ik, and Cup'ig speakers can converse without difficulty, and the regional population is often described using the larger term of Yup'ik. They are one of the four Yupik peoples of Alaska and Siberia, closely related to the Sugpiaq ~ Alutiiq (Pacific Yupik) of south-central Alaska, the Siberian Yupik of St. Lawrence Island and Russian Far East, and the Naukan of Russian Far East.

The Yup'ik combine a contemporary and a traditional subsistence lifestyle in a blend unique to the Southwest Alaska. Today, the Yup'ik generally work and live in western style but still hunt and fish in traditional subsistence ways and gather traditional foods. Most Yup'ik people still speak the native language and bilingual education has been in force since the 1970s.

The neighbours of the Yup'ik are the Iñupiaq  to the north, Aleutized Alutiiq ~ Sugpiaq to the south, and Alaskan Athabaskans, such as Yup'ikized Holikachuk and Deg Hit'an, non-Yup'ikized Koyukon and Dena'ina, to the east.

Naming
Originally, the singular form  was used in the northern area (Norton Sound, Yukon, some Nelson Island) while the form  was used in the southern area (Kuskokwim, Canineq [around Kwigillingok, Kipnuk, Kongiganak, and Chefornak], Bristol Bay).

The form  is now used as a common term (though not replacing  and ).  comes from the Yup'ik word , meaning 'person', plus the postbase  (or ), meaning 'real' or 'genuine'; thus,  literally means 'real person'. The ethnographic literature sometimes refers to the Yup'ik people or their language as Yuk or Yuit. In the Hooper Bay-Chevak and Nunivak dialects of Yup'ik, both the language and the people are given the name .

The use of an apostrophe in the name , compared to Siberian , exemplifies Central Yup'ik's orthography: "The apostrophe represents gemination [or lengthening] of the 'p' sound."

The following are names given to them by their neighbors.
Alutiiq ~ Sugpiaq:  (Northern Kodiak),  (Southern Kodiak)
Deg Xinag Athabaskan:  [lit. 'downriver people'],  [lit. 'coast people'] 
Holikachuk Athabaskan:  [lit. 'coast people'] 
Iñupiaq:  
Koyukon Athabaskan:  [lit. 'coast people'] 
Dena'ina Athabaskan: , 
Upper Kuskokwim Athabaskan: sg. , pl.

History

Origins
The common ancestors of the Yupik and the Aleut (as well as various Paleo-Siberian groups) are believed by archaeologists to have their origin in eastern Siberia. Migrating east, they reached the Bering Sea area about 10,000 years ago. Research on blood types and linguistics suggests that the ancestors of American Indians reached North America in waves of migration before the ancestors of the Eskimo and Aleut; there were three major waves of migration from Siberia to the Americas by way of the Bering land bridge. This causeway became exposed between 20,000 and 8,000 years ago during periods of glaciation.

By about 3,000 years ago the progenitors of the Yupiit had settled along the coastal areas of what would become western Alaska, with migrations up the coastal rivers—notably the Yukon and Kuskokwim—around 1400 C.E., eventually reaching as far upriver as Paimiut on the Yukon and Crow Village (Tulukarugmiut) on the Kuskokwim.

Before a Russian colonial presence emerged in the area, the Aleut and Yupik spent most of their time sea-hunting animals such as seals, walruses, and sea lions. They used mainly wood, stone, or bone weapons and had limited experience fishing. Families lived together in large groups during the winter and split up into smaller huts during the summer.

Russian colonization
The Russian colonization of the Americas lasted from 1732 to 1867. The Russian Empire supported ships traveling from Siberia to America for whaling and fishing expeditions. Gradually the crews established hunting and trading posts of the Shelikhov-Golikov Company in the Aleutian Islands and northern Alaska indigenous settlements. (These were the basis for the Russian-American Company). Approximately half of the fur traders were Russians, such as promyshlenniki from various European parts of the Russian Empire or from Siberia.

After the Bering expedition in 1741, Russians raced to explore the Aleutian Islands and gain control of its resources. The Indigenous peoples were forced to pay taxes in the form of beaver and seal fur and opted to do so rather than fight the ever-growing stream of Russian hunters.

Grigory Shelikhov led attacks on Kodiak Island against the indigenous Alutiiq (Sugpiaqs) in 1784, known as the Awa'uq Massacre. According to some estimates, Russian employees of the trading company killed more than 2,000 Alutiiq. The company then took over control of the island. By the late 1790s, its trading posts had become the centers of permanent settlements of Russian America (1799–1867). Until about 1819, Russian settlement and activity were largely confined to the Aleutian Islands, the Pribilof Islands, Kodiak Island, and scattered coastal locations on the mainland. Russian Orthodox missionaries went to these islands, where in 1800 priests conducted services in the local language on Kodiak Island, and by 1824 in the Aleutian Islands. An Orthodox priest translated the Holy Scripture and the liturgy into Tlingit language, which was used by other major people of Alaska Natives.

The Russian period, lasting roughly 120 years, can be divided into three 40-year periods: 1745 to 1785, 1785 to 1825, and 1825 to 1865.

The first phase of the Russian period (1745 to 1785) affected only the Aleut (Unangan) and Alutiiq (Sugpiaq) profoundly. During this period, large sectors of the Bering Sea coast were mapped by the English explorer James Cook, rather than by the Russians. In 1778, Cook discovered and named Bristol Bay and then sailed northward around Cape Newenham into Kuskokwim Bay.

During the second phase of the Russian period (1785 to 1825), the Shelikhov-Golikov Company and later the Russian-American Company was organized and continued in the exploration of the lucrative north Pacific Ocean sea otter trade. During this time, they improved their treatment of the native people, skipping massacres for virtual enslavement and exploitation. The major portion of Alaska remained little known, and the Yup'ik of the Yukon-Kuskokwim delta were not strongly affected. The Russo-American Treaty of 1824 was signed in St. Petersburg between representatives of the Russian Empire and the United States on April 17, 1824, and went into effect on January 12, 1825.

During the last phase of the Russian period (1825 to 1865), the Alaska Natives began to suffer the effects of introduced infectious diseases, to which they had no acquired immunity. In addition, their societies were disrupted by increasing reliance on European trade goods from the permanent Russian trading posts. A third influence was the early Russian Orthodox missionaries, who sought to convert the peoples to their form of Christianity. The missionaries learned native languages, and conducted services in those languages from the early decades of the 19th century. The Treaty of Saint Petersburg of 1825 defined the boundaries between Russian America and British Empire claims and possessions in the Pacific Northwest.

United States colonization
The United States purchased Alaska from the Russian Empire on March 30, 1867. Originally organized as the Department of Alaska (1867–1884), the area was renamed as the District of Alaska (1884–1912) and the Territory of Alaska (1912–1959) before it was admitted to the Union as the State of Alaska (1959–present).

During the Early American Period (1867–1939), the federal government generally neglected the territory, other than using positions in territorial government for political patronage. There was an effort to exploit the natural resources in the years following the purchase of Alaska. Moravian Protestant (1885) and Jesuit Catholic (1888) missions and schools were established along the Kuskokwim and lower Yukon rivers, respectively. The Qasgiq disappeared due to missionary coercion. During the early American period, native languages were forbidden in mission schools, where only English was permitted.

The economy of the islands also took a hit under American ownership. Hutchinson, Cool & Co., an American trading company, took advantage of its position as the only trader in the area and charged the natives as much as possible for its goods. The combination of high costs and low hunting and fishing productivity persisted until the Russo-Japanese war cut off contact with Russia.

The Alaska Native Claims Settlement Act (ANCSA) was signed into law on December 18, 1971. The ANCSA is central to both Alaska's history and current Alaska Native economies and political structures.

Historiography
Before European contact (until the 1800s), the history of the Yup'ik, like that of other Alaska Natives, was oral tradition. Each society or village had storytellers (qulirarta) who were known for their memories, and those were the people who told the young about the group's history. Their stories (traditional legends qulirat and historical narratives qanemcit) express crucial parts of Alaska's earliest history.

The historiography of the Yup'ik ethnohistory, as a part of Eskimology, is slowly emerging. The first academic studies of the Yup'ik tended to generalize all "Eskimo" cultures as homogeneous and changeless.

While the personal experiences of non-natives who visited the Indigenous people of what is now called Alaska formed the basis of early research, by the mid-20th century archaeological excavations in southwestern Alaska allowed scholars to study the effects of foreign trade goods on 19th-century Eskimo material culture. Also, translations of pertinent journals and documents from Russian explorers and the Russian-American Company added breadth to the primary source base. The first ethnographic information about the Yup'ik of the Yukon-Kuskokwim Delta was recorded by the Russian explorer Lieutenant Lavrenty Zagoskin, during his explorations for the Russian-American Company in 1842–1844.

The first academic cultural studies of southwestern Alaskan Indigenous people were developed only in the late 1940s. This was due in part to a dearth of English-language documentation, as well as competition in the field of other subject areas. American anthropologist Margaret Lantis (1906–2006) published The Social Culture of the Nunivak Eskimo in 1946; it was the first complete description of any Alaskan indigenous group. She began Alaskan Eskimo Ceremonialism (1947) as a broad study of Alaskan Indigenous people. James W. VanStone (1925–2001), an American cultural anthropologist, and Wendell H. Oswalt were among the earliest scholars to undertake significant archaeological research in the Yup'ik region. VanStone demonstrates the ethnographic approach to cultural history in Eskimos of the Nushagak River: An Ethnographic History (1967). Wendell Oswalt published a comprehensive ethnographic history of the Yukon–Kuskokwim delta region, the longest and most detailed work on Yup'ik history to date in Bashful No Longer: An Alaskan Eskimo ethnohistory, 1778–1988 (1988). Ann Fienup-Riordan (born 1948) began writing extensively about the Yukon-Kuskokwim Indigenous people in the 1980s; she melded Yup'ik voices with traditional anthropology and history in an unprecedented fashion.

The historiography of western Alaska has few Yup'ik scholars contributing writings. Harold Napoleon, an elder of Hooper Bay, presents an interesting premise in his book Yuuyaraq: The Way of the Human Being (1988). A more scholarly, yet similar, treatment of cultural change can be found in Angayuqaq Oscar Kawagley's A Yupiaq Worldview: a Pathway to Ecology and Spirit (2001), which focuses on the intersection of Western and Yup'ik values.

Yuuyaraq
Yuuyaraq or Way of life (yuuyaraq sg yuuyarat pl in Yup'ik, cuuyaraq in Cup'ik, cuuyarar in Cupig) is the term for the Yup'ik way of life as a human being. The expression encompasses interactions with others, subsistence or traditional knowledge, environmental or traditional ecological knowledge, and understanding, indigenous psychology, and spiritual balance.

Yuuyaraq defined the correct way of thinking and speaking about all living things, especially the great sea and land mammals on which the Yup'ik relied for food, clothing, shelter, tools, kayaks, and other essentials. These great creatures were sensitive; they were believed able to understand human conversations, and they demanded and received respect. Yuuyaraq prescribed the correct method of hunting and fishing and the correct way of handling all fish and game caught by the hunter in order to honor and appease the spirits and maintain a harmonious relationship with the fish and game. Although unwritten, this way can be compared to Mosaic law because it governed all aspects of a human being's life.

Elders
An Alaska Native elder (tegganeq sg tegganrek dual tegganret pl in Yup'ik, teggneq sg teggnerek ~ teggenrek dual teggneret ~ teggenret pl in Cup'ik, taqnelug in Cupig) is a respected elder. The elder is defined as an individual who has lived an extended life, maintains a healthy lifestyle, and has a wealth of cultural information and knowledge. The elder has expertise based upon know-how and provides consultation to the community and family when needed. Traditionally, knowledge was passed down from the elders to the youth through storytelling. A naucaqun is a lesson or reminder by which the younger generation learns from the experience of the elders.

Tegganeq is derived from the Yup'ik word tegge- meaning "to be hard; to be tough". Yup'ik discipline is different from Western discipline. The discipline and authority within Yup'ik child-rearing practices have at their core respect for the children.

More recently, elders have been invited to attend and present at national conferences and workshops. Elders-in-residence is a program that involves elders in teaching and curriculum development in a formal educational setting (oftentimes a university), and is intended to influence the content of courses and the way the material is taught.

Society

Kinship
The Yup'ik kinship is based on what is formally classified in academia as an Eskimo kinship or lineal kinship. This kinship system is bilateral and a basic social unit consisting of from two to four generations, including parents, offspring, and parents' parents. Kinship terminologies in the Yup'ik societies exhibit a Yuman type of social organization with bilateral descent, and Iroquois cousin terminology. Bilateral descent provides each individual with his or her own unique set of relatives or kindred: some consanguineal members from the father's kin group and some from the mother's, with all four grandparents affiliated equally with the individual. Parallel cousins are referenced by the same terms as siblings, and cross cousins are differentiated. Marriages were arranged by parents. Yup'ik societies (regional or socio-territorial groups) were shown to have a band organization characterized by extensive bilaterally structured kinship with multifamily groups aggregating annually.

Community
The Yup'ik created larger settlements in winter to take advantage of group subsistence activities. Villages were organized in certain ways. Cultural rules of kinship served to define relationships among the individuals of the group. Villages ranged in size from just two to more than a dozen sod houses (ena) for women and girls, one (or more in large villages) qasgiq for men and boys, and warehouses.

Leadership
Formerly, social status was attained by successful hunters who could provide food and skins. Successful hunters were recognized as leaders by members of the social group. Although there were no formally recognized leaders, informal leadership was practiced by or in the men who held the title Nukalpiaq ("man in his prime; successful hunter and good provider"). The nukalpiaq, or good provider, was a man of considerable importance in village life. This man was consulted in any affair of importance affecting the village in general, particularly in determining participation in the Kevgiq and Itruka'ar ceremonies. He was said to be a major contributor to those ceremonies and provider to orphans and widows.

The position of the nukalpiaq was not, however, comparable to that of the umialik (whaling captain) of northern and northwestern Alaska Iñupiaq. The captain had the power to collect the surplus of the village and much of the basic production of individual family members and later redistribute it.

Residence

Traditionally, in the winter the Yup'ik lived in semi-permanent subterranean houses, with some for the men and others for the women (with their children). The Yup'ik men lived together in a larger communal house (qasgiq), while women and children lived in smaller, different sod houses (ena). Although the men and women lived separately, they had many interactions. Depending on the village, qasgiq and ena were connected by a tunnel. Both qasgiq and ena also served as schools and workshops for young boys and girls. Among the Akulmiut, the residential pattern of separate houses for women and children and a single residence for men and boys persisted until about 1930.

The women's house or Ena ([e]na sg nek dual net pl in Yup'ik, ena sg enet pl in Cup'ik, ena in Cup'ig) was an individual or semi-communal smaller sod house. They looked similar in construction to the qasgiqs but were only about half the size. Women and children lived in houses that served as residences for two to five women and their children. Raising children was the women's responsibility until young boys left the home to join other males in the qasgiq to learn discipline and how to make a living. The ena also served as a school and workshop for young girls, where they could learn the art and craft of skin sewing, food preparation, and other important survival skills.

Men's house or Qasgiq (is pronounced as "kaz-geek" and often referred to as kashigi, kasgee, kashim, kazhim, or casine in the old literature; qasgi ~ qasgiq sg qasgik dual qasgit pl in Yup'ik, qaygiq sg qaygit pl in Cup'ik, kiiyar in Cup'ig; qasgimi "in the qasgi") is a communal larger sod house. The qasgiq was used and occupied from November through March. The qasgiq housed all adult males in the community and male youth about seven years and older. The women prepared meals in their houses, known as ena. These were taken to the males in the qasgiq by young women and girls.

The qasgiq served as a school and workshop for young boys, where they could learn the art and craft of mask making, tool making, and kayak construction. It was also a place for learning hunting and fishing skills. At times, the men created a firebath, where hot fires and rocks produced heat to aid in body cleansing. Thus, the qasgiq was a residence, bathhouse, and workshop for all but the youngest male community members who still lived with their mothers. Although there were no formally recognized leaders or offices to be held, men and boys were assigned specific places within the qasgiq that distinguished the rank of males by age and residence. The qasgiq was a ceremonial and spiritual center for the community.

In primary villages, all ceremonies (and Yup'ik dancing) and gatherings (within and between villages among the socio-territorial and neighboring groups) took place in the qasgiq. During the early 20th century, Christian church services were held in the qasgiq before churches were constructed. Virtually all official business, within the group, between groups and villages, and between villagers and non-Yup'ik (such as early missionaries) was conducted in the qasgiq.

The Yup'ik Eskimo did not live in igloos or snow houses. But, the northern and northwestern Alaskan Iñupiaq built snow houses for temporary shelter during their winter hunting trips. The word iglu means "house" in Iñupiaq. This word is the Iñupiaq cognate of the Yup'ik word ngel'u ("beaver lodge, beaver house"), which it resembled in shape.

Regional groups
Among the Yup'ik of southwestern Alaska, societies (regional or socio-territorial groups), like those of the Iñupiat of northwestern Alaska, were differentiated by territory, speech patterns, clothing details, annual cycles, and ceremonial life.

Prior to and during the mid-19th century, the time of Russian exploration and presence in the area, the Yupiit were organized into at least twelve, and perhaps as many as twenty, territorially distinct regional or socio-territorial groups (their native names will generally be found ending in -miut postbase which signifies "inhabitants of ..." tied together by kinship—hence the Yup'ik word tungelquqellriit, meaning "those who share ancestors (are related)". These groups included:
 Unalirmiut (Unaligmiut), inhabiting the Norton Sound area. The name derives from the Yup'ik word Unaliq, denoting a Yup'ik from the Norton Sound area, especially the north shore villages of Elim and Golovin and the south shore villages of Unalakleet and St. Michael. Unalirmiut were speakers of the Norton Sound Unaliq subdialect of Yup'ik.
 Pastulirmiut, inhabiting the mouth of the Yukon River. The name derives from Pastuliq, the name of an abandoned village of southern Norton Sound near the present-day village of Kotlik at one of the mouths of the Yukon River. The village name comes from the root paste- meaning to become set in a position (for instance, a tree bent by the wind). Pastulirmiut were speakers of the Norton Sound Kotlik subdialect of Yup'ik, and are also called pisalriit (sing. pisalria) denoting their use of this subdialect in which s is used in many words where other speakers of Yup'ik use y.
 Kuigpagmiut (Ikogmiut), inhabiting the Lower Yukon River. The name derives from Kuigpak, meaning "big river", the Yup'ik name for the Yukon River.
 Marayarmiut (Mararmiut, Maarmiut, Magemiut), inhabiting the Scammon Bay area. The name derives from Marayaaq, the Yup'ik name for Scammon Bay, which in turn derives from maraq, meaning "marshy, muddy lowland". Mararmiut, deriving from the same word, denotes flatland dwellers in general living between the mouth of the Yukon and Nelson Island.
 Askinarmiut, inhabiting the area of the present-day villages of Hooper Bay and Chevak. Askinarmiut is an old name for the village of Hooper Bay. (DCED).
 Qaluyaarmiut (Kaialigamiut, Kayaligmiut), inhabiting Nelson Island. The name derives from Qaluyaaq, the Yup'ik name for Nelson Island, which derives in turn from qalu, meaning "dipnet". In the Qaluuyaaq, there are three villages. Those villages are Toksook bay, Nightmute, and Tununak.
 Akulmiut, inhabiting the tundra or "Big Lake" area north of the Kuskokwim River. The name denotes people living on the tundra—as opposed to those living along the coastline or major rivers—such as in the present-day villages of Nunapitchuk, Kasigluk, or Atmautluak. The name derives from akula meaning "midsection", "area between", or "tundra".
 Caninermiut, inhabiting the lower Bering Sea coast on either side of Kuskokwim Bay, including the area north of the bay where the modern-day villages of Chefornak, Kipnuk, Kongiganak, Kwigillingok are located and south of the bay where the villages of and Eek and Quinhagak are located (Goodnews Bay?). The name derives from canineq, meaning "lower coast", which derives in turn from the root cani, "area beside".
 Nunivaarmiut (Nuniwarmiut, Nuniwagamiut), inhabiting Nunivak Island. The name derives from Nunivaaq, the name for the island in the General Central dialect of Yup'ik. In the Nunivak dialect of Yup'ik (that is, in Cup'ig), the island's name is Nuniwar and the people are called Nuniwarmiut.
 Kusquqvagmiut (Kuskowagamiut), inhabiting the Lower and middle Kuskokwim River. The name derives from Kusquqvak, the Yup'ik name for the Kuskokwim River, possibly meaning "a big thing (river) with a small flow". The Kusquqvagmiut can be further divided into two groups:
 Unegkumiut, inhabiting the Lower Kuskokwim below Bethel to its mouth in Kuskowkim Bay. The word derives from unegkut, meaning "those downriver"; hence, "downriver people".
 Kiatagmiut, inhabiting inland regions in the upper drainages of the Kuskowkim, Nushagak, Wood, and Kvichak river drainages. The word derives probably from kiani, meaning "inside" or "upriver"; hence, "upriver people". The Kiatagmiut lived inland along the Kuskokwim River drainage from the present location of Bethel to present-day Crow Village and the vicinity of the 19th-century Russian outpost Kolmakovskii Redoubt. By the mid-19th century, many Kiatagmiut had migrated to the drainage of the Nushagak River.
 Tuyuryarmiut (Togiagamiut), inhabiting the Togiak River area. The word derives from Tuyuryaq, the Yup'ik name for the village of Togiak.
 Aglurmiut (Aglegmiut), inhabiting the Bristol Bay area along the Lower Nushagak River and the northern Alaska Peninsula. The word derives from agluq, meaning "ridgepole" or "center beam of a structure".

While Yupiit were nomadic, the abundant fish and game of the Y-K Delta and Bering Sea coastal areas permitted for a more settled life than for many of the more northerly Iñupiaq people. Under normal conditions, there was little need for interregional travel, as each regional group had access to enough resources within its own territory to be completely self-sufficient. However, fluctuations in animal populations or weather conditions sometimes necessitated travel and trade between regions.

Economy

Hunting-gathering

The homeland of Yup'ik is the Dfc climate type subarctic tundra ecosystem. The land is generally flat tundra and wetlands. The area covers about 100,000 square miles which are roughly about 1/3 of Alaska. Their lands are located in five of the 32 ecoregions of Alaska:

Before European contact, the Yup'ik, like other neighboring Indigenous groups, were semi-nomadic hunter-fisher-gatherers who moved seasonally throughout the year within a reasonably well-defined territory to harvest sea and land mammals, fish, bird, berry and other renewable resources. The economy of Yup'ik is a mixed cash-subsistence system, like other modern foraging economies in Alaska. The primary use of wild resources is domestic. Commercial fishing in Alaska and trapping patterns are controlled primarily by external factors.

On the coast, in the past as in the present, to discuss hunting was to begin to define a man. In Yup'ik, the word anqun (man) comes from the root angu- (to catch after chasing; to catch something for food) and means, literally, a device for chasing.

Northwest Alaska is one of the richest Pacific salmon areas in the world, with the world's largest commercial Alaska salmon fishery in Bristol Bay.

Trade
In the Nome Census Area, Brevig Mission, an Iñupiaq community, tended to trade with other Iñupiaq communities to the north: Shishmaref, Kotzebue, and Point Hope. The Yup'ik communities (Elim, Stebbins and St. Michael), tended to trade with Yup'ik communities to the south: Kotlik, Emmonak, Mountain Village, Pilot Station, St. Mary's of the Kusilvak Census Area.

Transportation

Traditionally, transportation was primarily by dog sleds (land) and kayaks (water). Sea mammal hunting and fishing in the Bering Sea region took place from both small narrow closed skin-covered boats called kayaks and larger broad open skin-covered boats called umiaks. Kayaks were used more frequently than umiaks. Traditionally, kayaking and umiaking served as water transportation and sea hunting. Dog sleds are ideal for land transportation. Pedestrian transportation is on foot in summer and snowshoes in winter. Only small local road systems exist in Southwest Alaska. Only a few closely adjacent villages are linked by roads. Today, snowmobile or snowmachine travel is a critical component of winter transport; an ice road for highway vehicles is used along portions of the Kuskokwim River.

The kayak (qayaq sg qayak dual qayat pl in Yup'ik and Cup'ik, qayar ~  qay'ar sg qay'ag dual qay'at ~  qass'it pl in Cup'ig; from qai- "surface; top")) is a small narrow closed skin-covered boat and was first used by the native speakers of the Eskimo–Aleut languages. The Yup'ik used kayaks for seal hunting, fishing, and general transportation. The Yup'ik people considered a kayak the owner's most prized possession. Traditionally, a kayak was a Yup'ik hunter's most prized possession and a symbol of manhood. It is fast and maneuverable, seaworthy, light, and strong. Kayak is made of driftwood from the beach, covered with the skin of a sea mammal, and sewn with sinew from another animal. Yup'ik kayaks are known from the earliest ethnographic reports, but there are currently no surviving full-size Yup'ik kayaks from the pre-contact period. The Yup'ik Norton Sound/Hooper Bay kayaks consisted of 5–6 young seal skins stretched for the covering. The Yup'ik style of seams contains a running stitch partially piercing the skin on top and an overlapping stitch on the inside with a grass insert. Caninermiut style Yup'ik kayak used in the Kwigillingok and Kipnuk regions and there are teeth marks in the wood of the circular hatch opening, made by the builders as they bent and curved the driftwood into shape.

Kayak stanchions or kayak cockpit stanchions (ayapervik sg ayaperviik dual ayaperviit pl or ayaperyaraq sg ayaperyarat pl in Yup'ik and Cup'ik, ayaperwig in Cup'ig) are top piece centered at the side of the coaming and used as support as one climbs out of a kayak. They prevented the person from falling while getting in and out of the kayak. All kayaks had ayaperviik on them. This one has a woman's frowning face with a down-turned mouth carved on it. Perhaps the other side would have a man's smiling face carved on it.

The umiak or open skin boat, large skin boat (angyaq sg angyak dual angyat pl in Yup'ik and Cup'ik, angyar in Cup'ig) is larger broad open skin-covered boat.

The dog sleds (ikamraq sg ikamrak dual ikamrat pl in Yup'ik and Cup'ik, qamauk in Yukon and Unaliq-Pastuliq Yup'ik, ikamrag, qamaug in Cup'ig; often used in the dual for one sled) are an ancient and widespread means of transportation for Northern Indigenous peoples, but when non-Native fur traders and explorers first traveled the Yukon River and other interior regions in the mid-19th century they observed that only Yupikized Athabaskan groups, including the Koyukon, Deg Hit'an and Holikachuk, used dogs in this way. Both of these people had probably learned the technique from their Iñupiat or Yup'ik neighbors. Non-Yupikized Athabaskan groups, including the Gwich'in, Tanana, Ahtna and other Alaskan Athabaskans pulled their sleds and toboggans by hand, using dogs solely for hunting and as pack animals.

Culture
Yup'ik (as Yup'ik and Cup'ik) culture is one of five cultural groups of the Alaska Natives.

The Yupiit Piciryarait Cultural Center is a non-profit cultural center of the Yup'ik culture centrally located in Bethel near the University of Alaska Fairbanks' Kuskokwim Campus and city offices. The mission of the center is to promote, preserve and develop the traditions of the Yup'ik through traditional and non-traditional art forms of the Alaska Native art, including arts and crafts, performance arts, education, and Yup'ik language. The center also supports local artists and entrepreneurs.

Language and literature

Language

The Yup'ik speak four or five Yupik languages. The Yup'ik people constitute the largest ethnic group in Alaska and the Yup'ik languages are spoken by the largest number of native persons. Yup'ik, like all Northern Indigenous languages, is a suffixing language made up of noun and verb bases to which one or more postbases and a final ending or enclitics are added to denote such features as a number, case, person, and position. The Yup'ik category of number distinguishes singular, plural, and dual. Yup'ik does not have a category of gender and articles. The Yup'ik orthography one sees nowadays was developed at the University of Alaska Fairbanks in the 1960s by native speakers of Yup'ik elders working with linguists. The Yup'ik are the most numerous of the various Alaska Natives. There are 10,400 speakers out of a population of 25,000, and the language is threatened in 2007, according to Alaska Native Language Center.

Enabling Linguistic Diversity and Multilingualism Worldwide.

It is a single well-defined language (now called Yup'ik or Yup'ik and Cup'ik) a dialect continuum with five major dialects: extinct Egegik (Aglegmuit-Tarupiaq), and living Norton Sound or Unaliq-Pastuliq dialect (two subdialects: Unaliq and Kotlik), General Central Yup'ik dialect (seven subdialects: Nelson Island and Stebbins, Nushagak River, Yukon or Lower Yukon, Upper or Middle Kuskokwim, Lake Iliamna, Lower Kuskokwim, and Bristol Bay), Hooper Bay-Chevak dialect (two subdialects: Hooper Bay Yup'ik and Chevak Cup'ik), and Nunivak Cup'ig dialect. Nunivak Island dialect (Cup'ig) is distinct and highly divergent from mainland Yup'ik dialects.

Education
Yup'ik was not a written language until the arrival of Europeans, the Russians, around the beginning of the 19th century. Pre-contact knowledge transfer and learning among Yup'ik people traditionally was through oral culture, with no written history or transcribed language. Children were taught about subsistence practices, culture, and social systems through stories, legends, toys, and examples of behavior.

The early schools for Alaska Natives were mostly church-run schools of the Russian Orthodox missions in Russian-controlled Alaska (1799–1867), and, after 1890, the Jesuits and Moravians, allowed the use of the Alaska Native languages in instruction in schools. However, in the 1880s, Presbyterian missionary Sheldon Jackson (1834–1909) began a policy of prohibiting Native languages in the mission schools he managed. When he became United States Commissioner of Education, he proposed a policy of prohibition of indigenous language use in all Alaskan schools. This policy came into full force in about 1910. From that time period until the passage of the Bilingual Education Act in 1968, children in Alaskan schools suffered severe treatment for speaking their Native languages in schools.

17 Yup'ik villages had adopted local elementary bilingual programs by 1973. In the 1980s and 1990s, Yup'ik educators became increasingly networked across village spaces. Between the early 1990s and the run of the century, students in Yup'ik villages, like youth elsewhere became connected to the Internet and began to form a "Yup'ik Worldwide Web". Through Facebook and YouTube, youth are creating new participatory networks and multimodal competencies.

Bilingualism is still quite common in Alaska today, especially among Native people who speak English in addition to their own language. All village schools are publicly funded by the state of Alaska. The school districts of the Yup'ik area:
Lower Yukon School District (LYSD). English and Yup'ik bilingual education is done at these schools:  Alakanuk, Emmonak, Hooper Bay, Ignatius Beans Memorial, Kotlik, Marshall, Pilot Station, Pitkas Point, Russian Mission, Scammon Bay, Sheldon Point.
Lower Kuskokwim School District (LKSD). English and Yup'ik (with Cup'ig at the Nunivak Island) bilingual education is done at these schools: Atmautluak, Akiuk-Kasigluk, Akula-Kasigluk, Ayaprun, BABS School, Bethel High School, Chefornak, EEK, Goodnews Bay, Gladys Jung, Kipnuk, Kongiganak, Kwethluk, Kwigillingok, M.E. School, Mekoryuk, Napakiak, Napaskiak, Newtok, Nightmute, Nunapitchuk, Oscarville, Platinum, Quinhagak, Toksook Bay, Tuntutuliak, Tununak, Pre-School. 
Yupiit School District (YSD) English and Yup'ik (with Cup'ig at the Nunivak Island) bilingual education is done at these schools: Akiachak, Akiak, Tuluksak 
Kashunamiut School District (KSD) is within the village of Chevak. English and Cup'ik bilingual education is done at this school.
Kuspuk School District. English and Yup'ik bilingual education is done at these schools: Lower Kalskag, Kalskag, Aniak, Chuathbaluk, Crooked creek, Red Devil, Sleetmute, Stony River.
Southwest Region School District (SWRSD). English and Yup'ik bilingual education are done at these schools: Aleknagik, Clarks Point, Ekwok, Koliganek, Manokotak, New Stuyahok, Togiak, Twin Hills

Literature
Yup'ik oral storytelling stories or tales are often divided into the two categories of Qulirat (traditional legends) and Qanemcit (historical narratives). In this classification then, what is identified as myth or fairytale in the Western (European) tradition is a quliraq, and a personal or historical narrative is a qanemciq.

Traditional Legends (quliraq sg qulirat pl in Yup'ik and Cup'ik, qulirer in Cup'ig) are traditional Yup'ik legends or mythical tales that have been transmitted from generation to generation and often have supernatural elements. These traditional stories that have been handed down by word of mouth and involve fictional, mythical, legendary, or historical characters, or animals taking on human characteristics, told for entertainment and edification. Yup'ik family legends (ilakellriit qulirait) are oral stories that have been handed down through the generations within a certain family.
Historical Narratives (qanemciq sg qanemcit pl or qanemci, qalamciq, qalangssak in Yup'ik and Cup'ik, qanengssi, univkangssi in Cup'ig) are a personal and historical Yup'ik narratives that can be attributed to an individual author, even though he or she has been forgotten.

The stories that previous generations of Yup'ik heard in the qasgi and assimilated as part of a life spent hunting, traveling, dancing, socializing, preparing food, repairing tools, and surviving from one season to the next. Yup'ik oral stories (qulirat and qanemcit) of the storytellers (qulirarta) were embedded in many social functions of the society. Storyknifing (yaaruilta literally "let's go story knife!") stories a traditional and still common activity of young girls and is told by children of all ages in the Yup'ik lands. These stories are illustrated by figures sketched on mud or snow with a ceremonial knife, known as a story knife or storytelling knife (yaaruin, saaruin, ateknguin, quliranguarrsuun in Yup'ik, qucgutaq in Cup'ik, igaruarun in Cup'ig). Story knives are made of wood (equaq is a wooden story knife) ivory or bone (cirunqaaraq is an antler story knife). In the Yup'ik storytelling tradition, an important aspect of traditional stories is that each listener can construct his or her own meaning from the same storytelling.

Art
The Yup'ik traditionally decorate almost all of their tools, even ones that perform smaller functions. Traditionally sculptures are not made for decoration. One of their most popular forms of the Alaska Native art is the Yup'ik mask. They most often create masks for ceremonies but the masks are traditionally destroyed after being used. These masks are used to bring the person wearing them luck and good fortune in hunts. Other art forms, including Yup'ik clothing, and Yup'ik dolls are the most popular.

Clothing

The traditional clothing system developed and used by the Yup'ik and other Northern Indigenous peoples is the most effective cold-weather clothing developed to date. Yup'ik clothing tended to fit relatively loosely. Skin sewing is an artistic arena in which Yup'ik women and a few younger men excel. Yup'ik women made clothes and footwear from animal skins (especially hide and fur of marine and land mammals for fur clothing, sometimes birds, also fish), sewn together using needles made from animal bones, walrus ivory, and bird bones such as front part of a crane's foot and threads made from other animal products, such as sinew. The semilunar woman's knife ulu is used to process and cut skins for clothing and footwear. Women made most clothing of caribou (wild caribou Rangifer tarandus granti and domestic reindeer Rangifer tarandus tarandus) and sealskin. The English words kuspuk (parka cover or overshirt) and mukluk (skin boot) which is derived from the Yup'ik word qaspeq and maklak. Before the arrival of the Russian fur traders (promyshlennikis), caribou and beaver skins were used for traditional clothing but Northern Indigenous peoples were compelled to sell most of their furs to the Russians and substitute (inferior) manufactured materials. Everyday functional items like skin mittens, mukluks, and jackets are commonly made today, but the elegant fancy parkas (atkupiaq) of traditional times are now rare. Today, many Yup'ik have adopted western-style clothing.

Mask

Yup'ik masks (kegginaquq and nepcetaq in Yup'ik, agayu in Cup'ig) are expressive shamanic ritual masks. One of their most popular forms of the Alaska Native art is masks. The masks vary enormously but are characterized by the great invention. They are typically made of wood and painted with few colors. The Yup'ik masks were carved by men or women but mainly were carved by men. They most often create masks for ceremonies but the masks are traditionally destroyed after being used. After Christian contact in the late 19th century, masked dancing was suppressed, and today it is not practiced as it was before in the Yup'ik villages.

The National Museum of the American Indian, as a part of the Smithsonian Institution, provided photographs of Yup'ik ceremonial masks collected by Adams Hollis Twitchell, an explorer and trader who traveled Alaska during the Nome Gold Rush newly arrived in the Kuskokwim region, in Bethel in the early 1900s.

Music and dance

Yup'ik dancing (yuraq in Yup'ik) is a traditional form of dancing usually performed to songs in Yup'ik. Round drums cover with seal stomachs and played with wooden sticks of driftwood to provide a rhythmic beat. Both men and women choreograph the dances and sing in accompaniment. Typically, the men are in the front, kneeling and the women stand in the back. The drummers are in the very back of the dance group. The Yup'ik use dance fans (finger masks or maskettes, tegumiak)to emphasize and exaggerate arm motions. Dancing plays an important role in both the social and spiritual life of the Yup'ik community. The Yup'ik have returned to practicing their songs and dances, which are a form of prayer. Traditional dancing in the qasgiq is a communal activity in the Yup'ik tradition. Mothers and wives brought food to the qasgiq (men's house) where they would join in an evening of ceremonial singing and dancing. The mask was a central element in Yup'ik ceremonial dancing. There are dances for fun, social gatherings, exchange of goods, and thanksgiving. Yup'ik ways of dancing (yuraryaraq) embrace six fundamental key entities identified as ciuliat (ancestors), angalkuut (shamans), cauyaq (drum), yuaruciyaraq (song structures), yurarcuutet (regalia) and yurarvik (dance location). The Yuraq is used as a generic term for Yup'ik/Cup'ik regular dance. Also, yuraq is concerned with animal behavior and hunting of animals or with the ridicule of individuals (ranging from affectionate teasing to punishing public embarrassment). But, used for inherited dance is Yurapik or Yurapiaq (lit. "real dance"). The dancing of their ancestors was banned by Christian missionaries in the late 19th century. After a century, the Cama-i dance festival is a cultural celebration that started in the mid-1980s with the goal to gather dancers from outlying villages to share their music and dances. There are now many groups that perform dances in Alaska. The most popular activity in the Yup'ik-speaking area is rediscovered Yup'ik dancing.

Yupik Dance Festivals 
Every year, the Yupiit of the Qaluuyaaq (Nelson Island) and the surrounding villages of Nelson Island gather up every weekend in each village. Each village hosts a Yupik dance festival which they call the festival Yurarpak (you-rawr-puk).

The qelutviaq is a one-string fiddle or lute played by the Yup'ik of Nelson Island.

Drums of Winter or Uksuum Cauyai: Drums of Winter (1977) is an ethnographic documentary on the culture of the Yup'ik people, focusing primarily on dance, music, and potlatch traditions in the community of Emmonak, Alaska.

Toys and games

An Eskimo yo-yo or Alaska yo-yo is a traditional two-balled skill toy played and performed by the Eskimo-speaking Alaska Natives, such as Inupiat, Siberian Yupik, and Yup'ik. It resembles fur-covered bolas and yo-yo. It is regarded as one of the most simple, yet most complex, cultural artifacts/toys in the world. The Eskimo yo-yo involves simultaneously swinging two sealskin balls suspended on caribou sinew strings in opposite directions with one hand. It is popular with Alaskans and tourists alike.

Doll

Yup'ik dolls (yugaq, irniaruaq, sugaq, sugaruaq, suguaq in Yup'ik, cugaq, cugaruaq in Cup'ik, cuucunguar in Cup'ig) are dressed in traditional-style clothing, intended to protect the wearer from cold weather, and are often made from traditional materials obtained through food gathering. Play dolls from the Yup'ik area were made of driftwood, bone, or walrus ivory and measured from one to twelve inches in height or more. Some human figurines were used by shamans. Dolls also mediated the transition between childhood and adulthood in the Yup'ik shamanism.

Cuisine

Yup'ik cuisine is based on traditional subsistence food harvests (hunting, fishing, and berry gathering) supplemented by seasonal subsistence activities. The Yup'ik region is rich in waterfowl, fish, and sea and land mammals. Yup'ik settled where the water remained ice-free in winter, where walruses, whales, and seals came close to shore, and where there was a fishing stream or a bird colony nearby. Even if a place was not very convenient for human civilization, but had a rich game, Yup'ik would settle there. The coastal settlements rely more heavily on sea mammals (seals, walrusses, beluga whales), many species of fish (Pacific salmon, herring, halibut, flounder, trout, burbot, Alaska blackfish), shellfish, crabs, and seaweed. The inland settlements rely more heavily on Pacific salmon and freshwater whitefish, land mammals (moose, caribou), migratory waterfowl, bird eggs, berries, greens, and roots help sustain people throughout the region. Traditional subsistence foods are mixed with what is commercially available. Today about half the food is supplied by subsistence activities (subsistence foods), and the other half is purchased from commercial stores (market foods, store-bought foods).

Traditional Yup'ik delicacies is, akutaq (Eskimo ice cream), tepa (stink heads), mangtak (muktuk).

Elevated cache or raised log cache, also raised cache or log storehouse (qulvarvik sg qulvarviit pl [Yukon, Kuskokwim, Bristol Bay, NR, Lake Iliamna], qulrarvik [Egegik], neqivik [Hooper Bay-Chevak, Yukon, Nelson Island], enekvak [Hooper Bay-Chevak], mayurpik [Hooper Bay-Chevak], mayurrvik [Nelson Island], ellivik [Kuskokwim], elliwig [Nunivak]) is a bear cache-like safe food storage place designed to store food outdoors and prevent animals from accessing it. Elevated cache types include log or plank caches, open racks, platform caches, and tree caches. The high cabin-on-post cache was probably not an indigenous form among either Eskimos or Alaskan Athabaskans. Cabin-on-post caches are thought to have appeared in the 1870s. The cabin on-post form may thus have been introduced by early traders, miners, or missionaries, who would have brought with them memories of the domestic and storage structures constructed in their homelands.

Fish

Fish as food, especially Pacific salmon (or in some places, non-salmon) species are the primary main subsistence food for the Yup'ik. Both food and fish (and salmon) called neqa (sg) neqet (pl) in Yup'ik. Also for salmon called neqpik ~ neqpiaq (sg) neqpiit ~ neqpiat (pl) in Yup'ik, means literally "real food". But, the main food for the Iñupiaq is meat of whale and caribou (both food and meat called niqi in Iñupiaq, also for meat called niqipiaq "real food").

Alaska subsistence communities are noted to obtain up to 97% of the omega-3 fatty acids through a subsistence diet.

Tepas, also called stink-heads, stink heads, stinky heads, are fermented fish head such as king and silver salmon heads, are a traditional food of the Yup'ik. A customary way of preparing them is to place fish heads and guts in a wooden barrel, cover it with burlap, and bury it in the ground for about a week.  For a short while in modern times, plastic bags and buckets replaced the barrel. However this increased the risk of botulism, and the Yup'ik have reverted to fermenting fishheads directly in the ground.

Mammals

Muktuk (mangtak in Yukon, Unaliq-Pastuliq, Chevak, mangengtak in Bristol Bay) is the traditional meal of frozen raw beluga whale skin (dark epidermis) with attached subcutaneous fat (blubber).

Plants
The tundra provides berries for making jams, jellies, and a Yup'ik delicacy commonly called akutaq or "Eskimo ice cream".

The mousefood (ugnarat neqait) consists of the roots of various tundra plants which are cached by voles in burrows

Ceremonies
The dominant ceremonies are: Nakaciuq (Bladder Festival), Elriq (Festival of the Dead), Kevgiq (Messenger Feast), Petugtaq (request certain items), and Keleq (invitation).

Religion

Shamanism

Historically and traditionally, Yup'ik and other all Eskimos traditional religious practices could be very briefly summarised as a form of shamanism based on animism. Aboriginally and in early historic times the shaman, called as medicine man or medicine woman (angalkuq sg angalkuk dual angalkut pl or angalkuk sg angalkuuk dual angalkuut pl in Yup'ik and Cup'ik, angalku in Cup'ig) was the central figure of Yup'ik religious life and was the middle man between spirits and the humans. The role of the shaman is the primary leader, petitioner, and a trans-mediator between the human and non-human spiritual worlds in association with music, dance, and masks. The shaman's professional responsibility was to enact ancient forms of prayers to request the survival needs of the people. The powerful shaman is called a big shaman (angarvak).

Yup'ik shamans directed the making of masks and composed the dances and music for winter ceremonies. The specified masks depicted survival essentials requested in ceremonies. Shamans often carved the symbolic masks that were vital to many Yup'ik ceremonial dances and these masks represented spirits that the shaman saw during visions. Shaman masks or plaque masks (nepcetaq sg nepcetak dual nepcetat pl) were empowered by shamans and are powerful ceremonial masks represented a shaman's helping spirit (tuunraq). Shamans wearing masks of bearded seal, moose, wolf, eagle, beaver, fish, and the north wind were accompanied by drums and music.

Legendary animals, monsters, and half-humans: amikuk (sea monster said to resemble an octopus); amlliq (monster fish); arularaq (monster identified as "Bigfoot"); cirunelvialuk (sea creature); cissirpak (great worm; ingluilnguq creature that is only half a person); inglupgayuk (being with half a woman's face); irci, irciq (creature, half animal and half man); itqiirpak (big hand from the ocean); kun'uniq (sea creature with human features seen on pack ice); meriiq (creature that will suck the blood from one's big toe); miluquyuli (rock-throwing creature); muruayuli (creature that sinks into the ground as it walks); paalraayak (creature that moves underground); qamurralek (being with a dragging appendage); qununiq (person who lives in the sea); qupurruyuli (being with human female face who helps people at sea); quq'uyaq (polar bear); quugaarpak (mammoth-like creature that lives underground); tengempak (giant bird); tengmiarpak ("thunderbird"); tiissiq (caterpillar-like creature that leaves a scorched trail); tumarayuli (magical kayak); tunturyuaryuk (caribou-like creature); u͡gayaran (giant in Kuskokwim-area folklore); ulurrugnaq (sea monster said to devour whales); uligiayuli (ghost said to have a big blanket, which it wraps around children who are out too late at night playing hide-and-seek, it then takes them away); yuilriq (witch or ghost that walks in the air above the ground and has no liver; a large monster that lives in the mountains and eats people).

Legendary humanoids: alirpak little person; cingssiik (little people having conical hats); ciuliaqatuk (ancestor identified with the raven); egacuayak (elf, dwarf); kelessiniayaaq (little people, said to be spirits of the dead); ircenrraq ("little person" or extraordinary person); tukriayuli (underground dweller that knocks on the earth's surface).

Christianity
Yupi'k in western and southwestern Alaska have had a long Christian history, in part from Russian Orthodox, Catholic, and Moravian influence. The arrival of missionaries dramatically altered life along the Bering Sea coast. Yup'ik beliefs and lifestyles have changed considerably since the arrival of Westerners during the 19th century.

The first Native Americans to become Russian Orthodox Church (later Orthodox Church in America) were the Aleuts (Unangan) living in contact with Russian fur traders (promyshlennikis) in the mid 18th century. Saint Jacob (or Iakov) Netsvetov, a Russian-Alaskan creole (his father was Russian from Tobolsk, and his mother was an Aleut from Atka Island) who became a priest of the Orthodox Church (he is the first Alaska Native Orthodox priest in Alaska) and continued the missionary work of St. Innocent among his and other Alaskan Native people. He moved to the Russian Mission (Iqugmiut) on the Yukon River in 1844 and served there until 1863. Netsvetov invented an alphabet and translated church materials and several Bible texts into Yup'ik and kept daily journals.

Orthodox hegemony in Yup'ik territory was challenged in the late 1880s by Moravian and Catholic missions.

The Moravian Church is the oldest Protestant denomination and is organized into four provinces in North America: Northern, Southern, Alaska, and Labrador. The Moravian mission was first founded at Bethel, along the Kuskokwim River in 1885. The mission and reindeer station Bethel (Mamterilleq literally "site of many caches") was first established by Moravian missionaries near or at the small Yup'ik village called Mumtrelega (Mamterilleq literally "site of many caches") or Mumtreklogamute or Mumtrekhlagamute (Mamterillermiut literally "people of Mamterilleq"). In 1885, the Moravian Church established a mission in Bethel, under the leadership of the Kilbucks and John's friend and classmate William H. Weinland (1861–1930) and his wife with carpenter Hans Torgersen. John Henry Kilbuck (1861–1922) and his wife, Edith Margaret Romig (1865–1933), were Moravian missionaries in southwestern Alaska in the late 19th and early 20th centuries. John H. Kilbuck was the first Lenape to be ordained as a Moravian minister. They served the Yup'ik, used their language in the Moravian Church in their area, and supported the development of a writing system for Yup'ik. Joseph H. Romig (1872–1951) was a frontier physician and Moravian Church missionary and Edith Margaret's brother, who served as Mayor of Anchorage, Alaska, from 1937 to 1938. Although the resemblances between Yup'ik and Moravian ideology and action may have aided the initial presentation of Christianity, they also masked profound differences in expectation.

The Society of Jesus is a Christian male religious congregation of the Catholic Church. The members are called Jesuits. In 1888, a Jesuit mission was established on Nelson Island and a year later moved to Akulurak (Akuluraq, the former site of St. Mary's Mission) at the mouth of the Yukon River. Segundo Llorente (1906–1989) was a Spanish Jesuit, philosopher, and author who spent 40 years as a missionary among the Yup'ik people in the most remote parts of Alaska. His first mission was at Akulurak.

During Christmas Yup'iks give gifts commemorating the departed.

Health

Food, clean water, and sanitation
Traditional subsistence foods, such as fish and marine mammals, and to a lesser extent shellfish, are the only significant direct dietary sources of two important types of the omega-3 fatty acids called eicosapentaenoic acid (EPA) and docosahexaenoic acid (DHA). EPA and DHA protect against heart disease and possibly diabetes. The replacement of a subsistence diet that is low in fat and high in omega-3s with a market-based Western diet has increased the risk of cardiovascular disease and diabetes in Alaska Natives. Many markets (store-bought) foods are high in fats, carbohydrates, and sodium; and these may lead to increased weight gain, high cholesterol (hypercholesterolemia), high blood pressure (hypertension), and chronic diseases.

Presently, two major problems for the growing population are water and sewage. Water from rivers and lakes is no longer potable as a result of pollution. Wells must be drilled and sewage lagoons built, but there are inherent problems as well. Chamber pots (qurrun in Yup'ik and Cup'ik, qerrun in Cup'ig) or honey buckets with waterless toilets are common in many rural villages in the state of Alaska, such as those in the Bethel area of the Yukon–Kuskokwim Delta. About one-fourth of Alaska's 86,000 Native residents live without running water and use plastic buckets, euphemistically called honey buckets, for toilets.

Alcohol epidemic 

When Alaska became a state in 1959, state laws took control of alcohol regulation from the federal government and Native communities. In 1981, however, the state legislature changed the alcohol laws to give residents broad powers, via a local option referendum, to regulate how alcohol comes into their communities. The 1986 statutes have remained in effect since that time, with only relatively minor amendments to formalize the prohibition on home brew in a dry community (teetotal) and clarify the ballot wording and scheduling of local option referendums. Alaska specifically allows local jurisdictions to elect to go dry by public referendum. State law allows each village to decide on restrictions, and some boroughs may prohibit it altogether.

Since the 1960s there has been a dramatic rise in alcohol abuse, alcoholism, and associated violent behaviors, which have upset family and village life and resulted in physical and psychological injury, death, and imprisonment. Alcohol abuse and suicide are more common among Alaska Natives than among most American racial/ethnic groups, especially among rural young Yup'ik men. Unintentional injury (accidents) and intentional self-harm (suicide) have been among the leading causes of death in Native Alaska for many years. Alaska Natives have higher rates of suicide than other Native Americans of the continental United States. Alcohol abuse and dependence are associated with high rates of violence and a variety of health problems.

As of 2009, about 12% of the deaths among American Indians and Alaska Natives were alcohol-related in the United States overall. Deaths due to alcohol among American Indians are more common in men and among Northern Plains Indians, but Alaska Natives showed the lowest incidence of death. Existing data do indicate, however, that Alaska Native alcohol-related death rates are almost nine times the national average, and approximately 7% of all Alaska Native deaths are alcohol-related.

A 1995-97 study by the Center for Disease Control found that in some continental Amerindian tribes the rate of fetal alcohol spectrum disorder was  1.5 to 2.5 per 1000 live births, more than seven times the national average, while among Alaska natives, the rate of fetal alcohol spectrum disorder was as high as 5.6 per 1000 live births.

Great Death
The Great Death or the Big Sickness (quserpak, literally "big cough") referred to the flu (influenza) pandemic (worldwide epidemic) of 1918. The 1918 flu pandemic (January 1918 – December 1920) was an unusually deadly influenza pandemic, the first of the two pandemics involving H1N1 influenza virus. It infected 500 million people across the world, including remote Pacific islands and the Arctic, and killed 50 to 100 million of them—three to five percent of the world's population—making it one of the deadliest natural disasters in human history.

In the U.S., about 28% of the population suffered, and 500,000 to 675,000 died. Native American tribes were particularly hard hit. In the Four Corners area alone, 3,293 deaths were registered among Native Americans. Entire villages perished in Alaska. The influenza epidemic across the Seward Peninsula in 1918 and 1919 wiped out about 50 percent of the native population of Nome (later an epidemic diphteria during 1925 serum run to Nome), and 8 percent of the native population of Alaska. More than 1,000 people died in northwest Alaska, and double that across the state, and the majority were Alaska Natives. The Alaska Natives had no resistance to either of these diseases. Native tribes had no immunity. As a result of epidemics, the Yup'ik world would go upside down; it would end. From there it spread like a wildfire to all corners of Alaska, killing up to 60 percent of the Northern Indigenous and Alaskan Athabaskan people. This epidemic killed whole families and wiped out entire villages. Many Kuskuqvamiut also migrated to the Bristol Bay region from the Kuskokwim River region to the north of Bristol Bay, especially after the influenza epidemic of 1918–19.

Modern tribal unions
Alaska Native tribal entities for the Yup'ik are recognized by the United States Bureau of Indian Affairs:

The Alaska Native Regional Corporations of the Yup'ik were established in 1971 when the United States Congress passed the Alaska Native Claims Settlement Act (ANCSA).

Notable Central Alaskan Yup'ik people
 Rita Pitka Blumenstein (1936–2021), the first certified traditional doctor in Alaska
 Ramy Brooks (born 1968), a kennel owner and operator, motivational speaker, and dog musher, descended from the Yup'ik Eskimos and Athabaskan Indians
 Callan Chythlook-Sifsof (born 1989), a Yup'ik-Inupiaq snowboarder olympian. Callan is the first Yup'ik Eskimo (Inuit) on the United States National Snowboard Team and Winter Olympic Team
 Crow Village Sam (1893–1974)
 Valerie Nurr'araaluk Davidson, Lieutenant Governor of Alaska
 Lyman Hoffman, a Democratic member of the Alaska Senate
 Emily Johnson (born 1976), an American dancer, writer, and choreographer of Yup'ik descent
 Oscar Kawagley (Angayuqaq) (born 1934), a Yup'ik anthropologist, teacher, and actor
 Marie Meade, a Yugtun language expert
 Olga Michael (1916–1979), a priest's wife from Kwethluk village; Native Alaskan of Yup'ik origin.
 Walt Monegan (born 1951), the former Police Chief of Anchorage
 Byron Nicholai, viral musician
 Todd Palin (born 1964), an American (has mainly English and Yup'ik ancestry) oil field production operator, commercial fisherman, and champion snowmobile racer. First Gentleman of Alaska (2006–2009).
 Mary Peltola (born 1973), Democratic politician and U.S. Representative for Alaska's at-large congressional district; first Alaska Native and the first woman to represent Alaska in the House
 Uyaquq (Helper Neck) (c. 1860–1924), Moravian helper, author, translator, and inventor of a Yup'ik writing system

See also 
Dear Lemon Lima, a family comedy feature film is about a 13-year-old half-Yup'ik girl navigating her way through her first heartbreak and the perils of prep school in Fairbanks, Alaska.

References

Bibliography
 Barker, James H. (1993). Always Getting Ready – Upterrlainarluta: Yup'ik Eskimo Subsistence in Southwest Alaska. Seattle, WA: University of Washington Press.
 Branson, John and Tim Troll, eds. (2006). Our Story: Readings from Southwest Alaska – An Anthology. Anchorage, AK: Alaska Natural History Association.
 Federal Field Committee for Development Planning in Alaska. (1968). Alaska Natives & The Land. Washington, DC: U.S. Government Printing Office.
 Fienup-Riordan, Ann. (1983). The Nelson Island Eskimo: Social Structure and Ritual Distribution. Anchorage, AK: Alaska Pacific University Press.
 Fienup-Riordan, Ann. (1990). Eskimo Essays: Yup'ik Lives and Howe We See Them. New Brunswick, NJ: Rutgers University Press.
 Fienup-Riordan, Ann. (1991). The Real People and the Children of Thunder: The Yup'ik Eskimo Encounter With Moravian Missionaries John and Edith Kilbuck. Norman, OK: University of Oklahoma Press.
 Fienup-Riordan, Ann. (1994). Boundaries and Passages: Rule and Ritual in Yup'ik Eskimo Oral Tradition. Norman, OK: University of Oklahoma Press.
 Fienup-Riordan, Ann. (1996). The Living Tradition of Yup'ik Masks: Agayuliyararput (Our Way of Making Prayer). Seattle, WA: University of Washington Press.
 Fienup-Riordan, Ann. (2000). Hunting Tradition in a Changing World: Yup'ik Lives in Alaska Today. New Brunswick, NJ: Rutgers University Press.
 Fienup-Riordan, Ann. (2001). What's in a Name? Becoming a Real Person in a Yup'ik Community. University of Nebraska Press.
 Jacobson, Steven A., compiler. (1984). Yup'ik Eskimo Dictionary. Fairbanks, AK: Alaska Native Language Center, University of Alaska Fairbanks.
 Jacobson, Steven A. "Central Yup'ik and the Schools: A Handbook for Teachers". Juneau: Alaska  Native Language Center, 1984.
 Kizzia, Tom. (1991). The Wake of the Unseen Object: Among the Native Cultures of Bush Alaska. New York: Henry Holt and Company.
 MacLean, Edna Ahgeak. "Culture and Change for Iñupiat and Yupiks of Alaska". 2004. Alaska. 12 Nov 2008 .
 Morgan, Lael, ed. (1979). Alaska's Native People. Alaska Geographic 6(3). Alaska Geographic Society.
 Naske, Claus-M. and Herman E. Slotnick. (1987). Alaska: A History of the 49th State, 2nd edition. Norman, OK: University of Oklahoma Press.
 Oswalt, Wendell H. (1967). Alaskan Eskimos. Scranton, PA: Chandler Publishing Company.
 Oswalt, Wendell H. (1990). Bashful No Longer: An Alaskan Eskimo Ethnohistory, 1778–1988. Norman, OK: University of Oklahoma Press.
 Pete, Mary. (1993). "Coming to Terms". In Barker, 1993, pp. 8–10.
Reed, Irene, et al. Yup'ik Eskimo Grammar. Alaska: U of Alaska, 1977.
 

Eskimos
Alaska Native ethnic groups
Native American tribes in Alaska
Indigenous languages of the North American Subarctic